Taeko Namba is a former international table tennis player from Japan.

Table tennis career
From 1957 to 1959 she won several medals in doubles, and in team events in the World Table Tennis Championships.

The four World Championship medals included three gold medals; two in the team event and one in the doubles with Kazuko Yamaizumi.

She also won two English Open titles.

See also
 List of table tennis players
 List of World Table Tennis Championships medalists

References

Japanese female table tennis players
Asian Games medalists in table tennis
Table tennis players at the 1958 Asian Games
Asian Games gold medalists for Japan
Asian Games bronze medalists for Japan
Medalists at the 1958 Asian Games